is a Japanese politician of the New Komeito Party, a member of the House of Representatives in the Diet (national legislature). A native of Yame, Fukuoka, he attended Kumamoto University as both undergraduate and graduate and studied abroad in Boston University in the United States. He was elected for the first time in 2000.

References

External links 
 Official website in Japanese.

Members of the House of Representatives (Japan)
Kumamoto University alumni
Boston University alumni
Living people
1956 births
New Komeito politicians
People from Yame, Fukuoka
21st-century Japanese politicians